Rokautskyia caulescens is a species of flowering plant in the family Bromeliaceae, endemic to Brazil (the states of Bahia and Espírito Santo). It was first described in 1998 as Cryptanthus caulescens.

References

caulescens
Flora of Brazil
Plants described in 1998